Ali Hachicha (born 5 April 1939) is a Tunisian judoka. He competed in the men's open category event at the 1964 Summer Olympics.

References

1939 births
Living people
Tunisian male judoka
Olympic judoka of Tunisia
Judoka at the 1964 Summer Olympics
Place of birth missing (living people)
20th-century Tunisian people